, born Masahiko Katō (加藤 雅彦 Katō Masahiko; January 2, 1940 – August 4, 2018) was a Japanese actor and director.

Career
Tsugawa was born January 2, 1940, in Kyoto, Japan. After acting as a child, he made his major debut at the age of 16 in the Kō Nakahira film Crazed Fruit in 1956. Tsugawa's family was heavily involved in the film industry since before his birth. Tsugawa attended school until dropping out of Waseda University Graduate School to pursue acting alone.

He gradually grew in popularity by playing villain roles in such television jidaigeki drama series as the Hissatsu series and appeared in films like Otoko wa tsurai yo: Watashi no tora-san and Godzilla, Mothra and King Ghidorah: Giant Monsters All-Out Attack. He was eventually adopted as one of director Juzo Itami's favourite actors, and went on to appear in nearly every one of his movies since Tampopo.

In television Tsugawa portrayed Tokugawa Ieyasu five times. He played Ieyasu in the 2000 Aoi Tokugawa Sandai and became the oldest actor who played a lead role in the Taiga drama.

Tsugawa recently debuted as a director under the pseudonym Makino Masahiko with his film Nezu no Ban. He chose this name because he is the nephew of the Japanese director Masahiro Makino, his mother's brother. Legend has it that Tsugawa was so awed by the director while watching him at work as a young child that he asked if he could use Makino as his last name should he ever be a director, because of the similarities of the first names.

Tsugawa comes from an illustrious film family. His older brother Hiroyuki Nagato was an actor. His wife Yukiji Asaoka was an actress. His grandfather is the director Shōzō Makino, his father, Kunitarō Sawamura, and his mother, Tomoko Makino, were both actors. His aunt and uncle through his father are the actors Sadako Sawamura and Daisuke Katō.

Tsugawa died August 4, 2018 due to heart failure. He was 78.

Filmography

Director 
 Asahiyama Zoo Story: Penguins in the Sky (2009)

Film 

 Kojiki Taishō (1952) - Hanawaka
 Sansho the Bailiff (1954) – Zushiō as a Boy
 Crazed Fruit (1956)
Farewell to Spring (1959)
Night and Fog in Japan (1960)
The Sun's Burial (1960)
Rokudenashi (Good-for-nothing) (1960)
Bitter End of a Sweet Night (1961)
Drunkard's Paradise (1961)
The Sun's Burial (1964)
Cuban Lover (1969)
 Otoko wa tsurai yo: Watashi no tora-san (1973)
 Time and Tide (1984)
 The Funeral (1984)
 Tampopo (1985)
Hitohira no yuki (1985)
 A Taxing Woman (1987) – Hanamura
 A Taxing Woman 2 (1988) – Hanamura
 A-Ge-Man: Tales of a Golden Geisha (1990)
 Heaven and Earth (1990) – Takeda Shingen
Minbo (1992)
The Strange Story of Oyuki (1992)
 Daibyonin (1993) – Dr. Ogata
 Crest of Betrayal (1994) – Ōishi Kuranosuke
A Last Note (1995)
 Supermarket Woman (1996) – Goro
 Hissatsu! Mondo Shisu (1996)
 Marutai no Onna (1997)
Pride: The Fateful Moment (1998) – Prime Minister Hideki Tojo
 Gamera 3: Revenge of Iris (1999)
 Godzilla, Mothra and King Ghidorah: Giant Monsters All-Out Attack (2001)
 The Man in White (2003)
 What the Snow Brings (2005)
 The Uchōten Hotel (2006)
 Death Note (2006) – Police Chief Saeki
 Death Note 2: The Last Name (2006) — Police Chief Saeki
 A Long Walk (2006)
 Hideo Nakata's Kaidan (2007)
 Genghis Khan: To the Ends of the Earth and Sea (2007)
 Aibō the Movie (2008)
 Postcard (2011)
 Strawberry Night (2013)
 0.5mm (2014)
 Lady Maiko (2014)
 The Boy and the Beast (2015) – Sōshi (voice)
 Solomon's Perjury 2: Judgment (2015) 
 Black Widow Business (2016) – Kōzō Nakase
 Ikitoshi Ikerumono (2017) – narrator

Television 

 Ryōma ga Yuku (1968) – Kusaka Genzui
 Shinsho Taikōki (1973)
 Katsu Kaishū (1974) – Tokugawa Yoshinobu
 Ōgon no Hibi (1978) – Tsuda Sōgyū
 Tokugawa Ieyasu (1983) – Ōkubo Nagayasu
 Ōoku (1983) - Tokugawa Tsunayoshi
 Miyamoto Musashi (1984–85) – Takuan Sōhō
 Hissastu Hashikakenin (1985) – Ryūji
 Hagoku (1985) – Keizaburō Suzue
 Dokuganryū Masamune (1987) – Tokugawa Ieyasu
 Tokugawa bugeichō: Yagyū sandai no ken (1992) – Tokugawa Ieyasu
 Hachidai Shōgun Yoshimune (1995) – Tokugawa Tsunayoshi
 Kenpō wa Madaka (1996) – Jōji Matsumoto
 Ieyasu ga mottomo osoreta otoko, Sanada Yukimura (1998) – Tokugawa Ieyasu
 Furuhata Ninzaburō (1999)
 Aoi (2000) – Tokugawa Ieyasu
 Chūshingura 1/47 (2001) – Kira Kōzukenosuke
 Shounen wa Tori ni Natta (2001)
 Furuhata Ninzaburō The Spanish Embassy Murder (2004)
 Sengoku Jieitai: Sekigahara no Tatakai (2006) – Tokugawa Ieyasu
 The Family (2007) – Finance minister Nagata
 Ultraman Ginga (2013) – Hotsuma Raido
 Samurai Rebellion (2013)
 Akagi (2015) – Iwao Washizu
 Nobunaga Moyu (2016) – Kaisen Joki
 Nemuri Kyoshirō The Final (2018)

Dubbing 
 The Little Prince, the Aviator

Awards and honors

Honor
 2006 Awarded Medal of Honor with Purple Ribbon from H.M. The Emperor of Japan
 2014 Awarded Order of the Rising Sun, Gold Rays with Rosette from H.M. The Emperor of Japan

Awards
 1982 Blue Ribbon Awards for Best Supporting Actor
 1986 Japanese Academy Awards Best Supporting Actor nomination for Hitohira no yuki
 1987 Mainichi Film Award Best Actor
 1987 Hochi Film Award Best Supporting Actor nomination for A Taxing Woman
 1988 Japanese Academy Awards Best Actor nomination for Wakarenu riyu
 1988 Japanese Academy Awards Best Supporting actor for A Taxing Woman
 1993 Japanese Academy Awards Best Actor nomination Bokuto kidan
 1994 Nikkan Sports Film Award Best Supporting Actor
 1995 Japanese Academy Awards Best Supporting Actor nomination for Shudan-sasen
 1999 Japanese Academy Awards Best Actor nomination for Puraido: Unmei no toki
 2014 Hochi Film Award Best Supporting Actor nomination for 0.5mm

References

External links
 Granpapa Pro Profile
 
 

1940 births
2018 deaths
People from Kyoto
Japanese male film actors
Japanese film directors
Recipients of the Medal with Purple Ribbon
Recipients of the Order of the Rising Sun, 4th class
Taiga drama lead actors
Male actors from Kyoto